is the 14th single by the Japanese female idol group Momoiro Clover Z, released in Japan on March 11, 2015. It debuted at number 4 in the weekly Oricon singles chart.

Unlike other main tracks from previous singles, "Seishunfu" has only a short version from their music video available on YouTube (reduced to 2'00"), and the full version (included only in a bonus disc in Limited Edition A) was not released. Instead releasing a full PV from "Seishunfu", clips from "Maku ga Agaru" were uploaded from the official MCZ channel prior to the release of "Z no Chikai".

An updated version from "Hashire!" (originally recorded in 2010, as of Momoiro Clover), was included for the single.

Track listing

Limited Edition A

Limited Edition B

Regular Edition

Charts

References

External links 
 "Seishunfu" in Momoiro Clover Z discography

2015 singles
2015 songs
Japanese-language songs
Momoiro Clover Z songs
King Records (Japan) singles